is a Japanese football player. He plays for YSCC Yokohama.

Career
Kensho Ogasawara joined J3 League club YSCC Yokohama in 2017.

References

External links

1995 births
Living people
Nippon Sport Science University alumni
Association football people from Tokyo
Japanese footballers
J3 League players
YSCC Yokohama players
Association football midfielders